Johnson Island is an ice-covered island, about  long and  wide, lying within the Abbot Ice Shelf, Antarctica, about  southeast of Dustin Island. It was remapped by the United States Geological Survey from U.S. Navy air photos, 1966, and was named by the Advisory Committee on Antarctic Names for Theodore L. Johnson, an electrical engineer at Byrd Station in 1964–65.

See also 
 List of Antarctic and sub-Antarctic islands

References

Islands of Ellsworth Land